Scaumenacia is an extinct genus of prehistoric lungfish. It lived around the Devonian in North America alongside another prehistoric lungfish: Fleurantia. It lived from approximately 384 to 376 millions of years ago.

See also

 Sarcopterygii
 List of sarcopterygians
 List of prehistoric bony fish

References

Prehistoric lungfish genera
Devonian fish of North America